Gasparo Lopez (c. 1677–1732) was an Italian painter of the Baroque period.

He was born at Naples and was an excellent painter of flowers, and therefore called Gasparo dei Fiori.  He studied under Jean Baptiste Du Buisson, Andrea Belvedere, and worked at Rome, Venice, and Dresden. He settled subsequently at Florence, where he became court painter to the grand-duke. Lopez was murdered there.

References

1670s births
1732 deaths
17th-century Italian painters
Italian male painters
18th-century Italian painters
Painters from Naples
Italian Baroque painters
Italian still life painters
Court painters
18th-century Italian male artists